Harold Goldblatt (born Israel Goldblatt, 5 July 1899 – 22 March 1982) was an actor, theatre director and theatre producer from Northern Ireland.

He was born in Manchester, England, to Russian Jewish parents, and subsequently moved with his family to Northern Ireland, where he grew up in Belfast. He married Leah (Lillie) Rosenzweig. They had two living children a daughter Joan and a son Ivan. He founded the Jewish Institute Dramatic Society, and remained a prominent member after their merger with the Northern Ireland Players and the Ulster Theatre in 1940 to form the Group Theatre. He left the Group Theatre in 1959, and in 1963 he formed the Ulster Theatre Company, which included a number of former Group members.

In the 1950s, he was frequently heard on BBC Radio as well as appearing in films and television. In film, he played Benjamin Guggenheim in A Night to Remember (1958), about the sinking of the Titanic, and on television, he played Concepta Riley's father Sean in four episodes of Coronation Street, Dr. O'Connell in Pathfinders in Space in 1961, and Professor Dale in the Doctor Who serial Frontier in Space in 1973; the latter two were both written by Malcolm Hulke

In 1966, Goldblatt received an honorary degree from Queen's University Belfast. He died in London, where he was working on the film Yentl, on 22 March 1982, aged 82. His documents and theatrical materials are archived at the Linen Hall Library, Belfast.

Filmography
 Jacqueline (1956) – Schoolmaster
 The Rising of the Moon (1957) – Barney Donigan – farmer
 Rooney (1958) – Police Inspector
 A Night to Remember (1958) – Benjamin Guggenheim
 The Siege of Sidney Street (1960) – Hersh
 Pathfinders in Space (1960) – Dr. O'Connell 
 Francis of Assisi (1961) – Bernard
 The Big Gamble (1961) – The Priest
 Coronation Street (1961) – Sean Riley
 The Inspector (1962) – Dr. Mitropoulos
 The Reluctant Saint (1962) – Father Giovanni
 Nine Hours to Rama (1963) – Selvrag Prahlad
 The Mind Benders (1963) – Professor Sharpey
 The Running Man (1963) – Tom Webster
 The Scarlet Blade (1963) – Jacob
 Children of the Damned (1964) – Harib
 Young Cassidy (1965) – Abbey Theatre Manager
 The Reptile (1966) – The Solicitor
 The 25th Hour (1967) – Isaac Nagy
 Sunday Bloody Sunday (1971) – Daniel's Father
 The Persuaders! (1971) – Maurice Devigne
 Something to Hide (1972) – Dibbick
 Doctor Who (In the serial "Frontier in Space") (1973) – Professor Dale
 The Abdication (1974) – Pinamonti

References

External links
 

1899 births
1982 deaths
20th-century male actors from Northern Ireland
British theatre directors
British theatre managers and producers
Jewish British male actors
Jewish theatre directors
Jews from Northern Ireland
Male film actors from Northern Ireland
Male radio actors from Northern Ireland
Male stage actors from Northern Ireland
Male television actors from Northern Ireland
Male actors from Belfast
Male actors from Manchester
People from Northern Ireland of Russian-Jewish descent